Land of Dreams (Ard el ahlam) is a 1993 Egyptian comedy film directed by Daoud Abdel Sayed. The film was selected as the Egyptian entry for the Best Foreign Language Film at the 67th Academy Awards, but was not accepted as a nominee.

Cast
 Faten Hamama as Nargis
 Yehia El-Fakharany as Raouf
 Hesham Selim as Magdi (son)
 Ola Rami as Daughter

See also
 List of submissions to the 67th Academy Awards for Best Foreign Language Film
 List of Egyptian submissions for the Academy Award for Best Foreign Language Film

References

External links
 

1993 films
1993 comedy films
Egyptian comedy films
1990s Arabic-language films